Ivair Ferreira (born 21 January 1945 in Bauru) is a retired Brazilian association football player nicknamed Ivair who played in Brazil for Portuguesa, Corinthians, Fluminense, América (RJ) and Paysandu (PA). Ferriera then played in the NASL between 1975 and 1979 for the Toronto Metros-Croatia and Toronto Blizzard, scoring the final goal in their 3–0 victory over Minnesota in the 1976 Soccer Bowl . In late 1979, he played in the National Soccer League with Toronto Panhellenic. He later played in the United States for the Cleveland Cobras, Kansas City Stars, Boston Athletic and Los Angeles Aztecs, before returning to Brazil with América. He earned one cap with the Brazil national team in 1966.

References

External links
 NASL career stats
 

1945 births
Living people
Brazilian footballers
Brazil international footballers
Associação Portuguesa de Desportos players
Sport Club Corinthians Paulista players
Fluminense FC players
America Football Club (RJ) players
Paysandu Sport Club players
Toronto Blizzard (1971–1984) players
North American Soccer League (1968–1984) players
Brazilian expatriate footballers
Expatriate soccer players in Canada
Brazilian expatriate sportspeople in Canada
Association football forwards
Canadian National Soccer League players
People from Bauru
Footballers from São Paulo (state)